The 2009–10 Memphis Tigers men's basketball team represented the University of Memphis in the 2009–10 college basketball season, the 89th season of Tiger basketball. The Tigers were coached by first-year head coach Josh Pastner, played their home games at the FedExForum in Memphis, Tennessee and are members of Conference USA. They finished the season 24–10, 13–3 in C-USA play. They were the 2 seed in the 2010 Conference USA men's basketball tournament where they were upset by 7 seed and eventual champion Houston. They failed to be invited to the NCAA tournament for the first time since 2005. Instead, the Tigers were invited to the 2010 National Invitation Tournament where they advanced to the second round before losing to the Ole Miss Rebels.

Preseason
The 2008–09 Memphis Tigers finished the season 33–4 (16–0), as Conference USA regular season and tournament champions. After three early losses, the Tigers went on a 27-game unbeaten streak, finally coming to an end with a season-ending 102–91 loss to the Missouri Tigers in the Sweet 16. Memphis finished the season ranked 9th in the final Coaches' Poll and 3rd in the AP Poll.

A turbulent offseason for the Tigers began with the news of Billy Gillispie's firing at the University of Kentucky. Despite assurances that “Memphis is where I want to coach,” John Calipari resigned as head coach of the Tigers to take the job at Kentucky on March 31, 2009. After a week-long coaching search, Memphis athletic director R.C. Johnson announced the hiring of former Arizona and Memphis assistant Josh Pastner as head basketball coach. At 32 years of age, Coach Pastner is the second-youngest men's head basketball coach in the NCAA.

Calipari's departure resulted in the disintegration of Memphis' recruiting class. Signed recruits DeMarcus Cousins and Darnell Dodson were allowed out of their letters of intent and followed Calipari to Kentucky. Xavier Henry was also allowed to leave, and while briefly considering following Calipari as well, ultimately decided to attend the University of Kansas. Guard Nolan Dennis was also allowed to leave, choosing to attend Baylor University. Of Memphis' original 2009 recruiting class, only JUCO forward Will Coleman decided to honor his commitment to play for the Tigers. Sophomore forward Ángel García lost most of the season with an ACL tear, but made an unexpected debut after only five months of recovery. Despite shooting 52% in 2-point field goals and 41% in 3-point field goals, García saw limited action due to the recovery process.

Memphis' roster was also devastated by other departures not directly related to the coaching change. Redshirt freshman C. J. Henry, brother of Xavier Henry, chose to transfer to Kansas to play with his brother after sitting out the season due to an ankle injury. Memphis recruit Latavious Williams decided not to honor his commitment, instead deciding to play professionally in China; ultimately, Williams was drafted into the NBA Development League. On March 31, 2009, freshman sensation Tyreke Evans declared himself eligible for the 2009 NBA Draft, ultimately being drafted 4th overall by the Sacramento Kings. Senior forward Shawn Taggart declared for the draft on June 6, 2009, despite having one year of eligibility remaining. Seniors Antonio Anderson and Robert Dozier also declared for the draft after their graduation from the University; Chance McGrady, brother of Houston Rockets guard Tracy McGrady also graduated, but did not declare for the draft.

The Tigers began the 2009–10 season on October 16, 2009 with Memphis Madness. Over 18,000 fans attended the free event at FedExForum, with several hundred fans turned away at the door by the Memphis Fire Department for safety reasons. The capacity crowd was the largest to ever witness a Memphis Madness event.

Departures

Statistics accurate as of 29 March 2010.

Recruiting

Roster

Schedule

|-
!colspan=9| Exhibition

|-
!colspan=9| Regular Season

|-
!colspan=9| 2010 Conference USA tournament

|-
!colspan=9| 2010 National Invitation Tournament

Notes

Memphis
Memphis Tigers men's basketball seasons
Memphis
Memphis
Memphis